Siġġiewi, also called by its title Città Ferdinand, is a city and a local council in the Southern Region of Malta. It is the third largest council in Malta by surface area, after Rabat and Mellieħa respectively. It is the home of 8,721 inhabitants as of January 2019.
Until several decades ago, most of the population was employed in the fields which surround the village. In 1993, the city adopted the motto Labore et Virtute (Work and Virtue).

History

In its demographic and topographical formation, Siġġiewi followed a pattern common to other villages in Malta. Before the arrival of the Order of St John in 1530, there were other thriving hamlets in the area. Little by little Ħal Xluq, Ħal Kbir, Ħal Niklusi and Ħal Qdieri were absorbed in Siġġiewi and today only their secluded chapels remain.

The origins of the name Siggiewi are unknown. The name is unique and bears no resemblance to well-known words. "Siggiewi" may be a corruption of an old name. The areas around Siggiewi were inhabited since the Maltese islands were occupied by the first farmers during the Neolithic period. The Neolithic sites of Hagar Qim and Mnajdra (3600-2500 BC) are within walking distance of the village. Also within easy reach of the village are the Bronze Age settlement of Wardija ta’ San Gorg, almost at the southern tail end of Dingli Cliffs, and the Bronze Age cart-ruts at ix-Xaghra ta’ Ghar il-Kbir (1500-750/800 BC).

An early Phoenician tomb was located in the area, but small Phoenician/Punic cemeteries are known on the hill top of tal-Gholja and at ix-Xaghra ta’ Ghar il-kbir. In numerous places, Roman pottery scatters are often encountered, suggesting that the environs of Siggiewi were also occupied during the Roman occupation of Malta and Gozo.

A series of early Christian catacombs are located close to Maghlaq valley. One of these, published in a number of sources, has been intentionally buried under a field.

Siggiewi's patron saint, Saint Nicholas, is perhaps one of the most popular saints in Byzantine hagiography. The survival of the saint's veneration may suggest that following the end of the catacomb era, some of Malta's villages may have retained old traditions that would very comfortably fall within western and eastern Christian domains.
Hundreds of place names are known from various fields and locations around Siggiewi. These names are of Semitic character, but are of an unknown age having been recorded in notarial deeds only in the Late Middle Ages. Some of these places developed into hamlets. Others may have supported small communities that were never recorded. These hamlets would later dwindle in importance. The depopulation of the Maltese rural areas during the Great Siege of 1565 hastened the end of small hamlets around Malta and Gozo. The arrival of the Order of St John in Malta in 1530, also ushered in new economic dynamics which made the new urban areas and especially the new city of Valletta more attractive than isolated villages.

Several buildings in Siggiewi date back to knight Hospitaller rule, including the Armoury. Siggiewi itself reflects these new concerns. Its growth may have been at the expense of neighbouring hamlets. But market agglomeration around Siggiewi, a promontory which stands between two important valleys and is therefore defensible, also encouraged geo-demographic changes.

On 30 December 1797, after a formal request by Don Salvatore Curso, on behalf of his parishioners, Grand Master Ferdinand Von Hompesch instituted the village as a city calling it after his name, "Città Ferdinand".

The ruins of the former parish church, dedicated to St Nicholas of Bari are still visible today. Lately, great restoration works have been carried out and retrieved its old glory. The baroque parish church, dedicated to the same saint, was erected by the villagers who raised the necessary funds between the years 1676 to 1693. It was designed by the Maltese architect, Lorenzo Gafà but underwent some changes throughout the years. The portico and naves were added by Professor Nicola Żammit in the latter half of the 19th century.

The titular painting in the church is by the artist Mattia Preti, 'Il calabrese', who was also responsible for the painting on the vault of St John's Co-Cathedral in Valletta. The wooden statue which is carried in procession in the city feast day (the last Sunday of June) was sculptured by Pietro Felici in 1736.

Fours years earlier, in 1732, the same sculptor had produced the stone statue which still stands in the centre of the square. On its pedestal there is a prayer in Latin which implores the saint to bless the fields which the faithful laboriously till.

Tourism

In Siġġiewi there is the Girgenti Palace, which was built in 1625 as the summer palace of inquisitor Onorato Visconti. It was renovated by inquisitor Angelo Dorini in 1763. Today it is the Maltese Prime Minister's official residence. The palace of Grand Master Verdalle is one of the residences of the Presidents of the Republic, called Verdala Palace. Adjoining this palace is the Buskett, a small semi-wild woodland which Grand Masters such as De Valette used as hunting grounds.

Within the local council of Siġġiewi lies Għar Lapsi, Fawwara, Girgenti, Ta' Kandja and the Hill of Laferla Cross. From there the islet of Filfla can be seen on the horizon. The village stands on a flat plateau flanked by two relatively deep valleys (Wied il-Hesri and Wied Xkora).

There are several niches in the old part of the city, some of which date back to the middle of the 17th century and are a sign of devotion as well as an architectural decoration. A number of small chapels are found within the boundaries of Siġġiewi, including that dedicated to Our Lady of Providence, which is a notable example of Maltese Baroque architecture.

Siġġiewi also celebrates its Feast in the last week of June, in honour of Saint Nicholas, with band marches around the streets, aerial fireworks and catherine wheels, street decorations and celebrations in the main church. The Limestone Heritage Park & Gardens is an attraction situated in a renovated quarry. Maltese summer folklore evening also take place between May and October. Malta Falconry Centre lies just outside the city.

Patron saint
Every village in Malta celebrates the local church's patron saint with a major festa lasting a week. When the main Saint Nicholas festa in Siggiewi is held the last Sunday in June, the Church of Saint Nicholas is decorated and lit, inside and out. The whole village, houses and all, are festooned with garlands, banners and flags. Festival week is also a time for visiting and hospitality as people come from all over Malta to enjoy the celebration.

Brass bands march and play in competition throughout the week. The oldest Siggiewi band, St. Nicholas Band Club, located on St. Nicholas Square, and the Siggiewi Festival Brass Band and Social Club, organized in the 1980s, both make the Siggiewi St. Nicholas feast one of Malta's most enjoyable.

As with most festivals, food is important. Food stalls sell ice cream, hot dogs, burgers, kebobs, chips and more. Special sweets include mqaret, pastry stuffed with dates, and white nougat with almonds or peanuts.

The week features many processions—one night features relics, another, St. Nicholas statue—and religious services. The liturgical music inside the Siggiewi Parish church is also at its best during this week, starting off with the triduum which are followed by a Solemn Benediction of the Blessed Sacrament, Solemn Te Deum, Vespers and Solemn mass on the day of the feast. Siggiewi is synonymous with music by the famed Paolo Nani.

On the evening before the Sunday feast day a major procession with brass bands goes through the village. The celebrations also feature a fireworks display. On Sunday the large St. Nicholas statue comes out of the church go in procession through the village. This procession has music, incense, confetti thrown by bystanders, and palm branches and flowers. On returning to the church the statue is welcomed with clapping, crying and singing. Inside the church the adoration of the Blessed Sacrament follows.

Each town strives to have the most extravagant fireworks and the most accomplished musicians. Festival organizers collect significant funds so they can add to their accumulation of statues, flags and banners. These rivalries go back a long time—when the churches were built, and parishioners gave generously to build the most elaborate churches they could afford.

Though the main festa, like most traditional festivals in Malta is in June, The liturgical feast of Saint Nicholas takes place on 6 December. There are also celebrations on this day although not on the large scale of those in June. The 6 December feast has become synonymous with a children's procession from the local Primary School to the Parish Church accompanied by the 2 local band clubs. In the evening a solemn mass is celebrated which is followed by fireworks and a musical concert by the Saint Nicholas Band Club. The 'Grupp tal-Armar 6 ta' Dicembru' which is responsible for the splendor and decorations worthy of a great feast decorate the main square with six artistic banners.

Culture and sport
Siġġiewi is the location of two band clubs, the Banda San Nikola A.D.1883 and the Siggiewi Festival Brass Band, founded in 1986. The Siggiewi Festival Brass Band was the first band established in Malta which plays only instruments made of brass. It is also the home of Siġġiewi Rowing Club (www.siggiewi-rowing.com), Siggiewi scout group, Siggiewi Football Club and Siggiewi Basketball Club. The St Nicholas Fireworks Factory is based in the town. Siggiewi is also home to the ta' Kandja shooting range which hosted the ISSF Shotgun World Cup in June 2018.

Zones in Siġġiewi
Buskett
Bur ix-Xewk
Fawwara
Girgenti
Għajn il-Kbira
Għar il-Kbir
Għar Lapsi
Għar Mundu
Ħal-Farruġ
Ħesri
Laferla Cross (Salib tal-Għolja)
Qajjied
Rdum Dikkiena
Ta' Brija
Ta' Nghajsa
Ta' Dun Konz
Ta' Fonzu
Ta' Fuq il-Blat
Ta' Kandja
Ta' Kirċippu
Ta' Raba'
Ta' Żagi
Ta' Zuta
Tal-Għaqba
Tal-Imwiegel
Tal-Għolja
Tal-Providenza
Vina l-Kbira
Wied il-Girgenti
Wied il-Ħesri
Wied il-Luq
Wied San Anton
Wied Xkora

References

Literature
 Carmel Vella, SIGGIEWI (Città Ferdinand)- A Profile of History, Social Life and Traditions.
 Pawlu Aquilina, Hawn Twieldet u tibqa' thabbat Qalbi. (My heart was born here and will beat here forever). Memoirs/social history of the last 70 years.

External links

 Siġġiewi Local Council
 Website about Siggiewi
 Map showing town and environs
 Website on 6 December Street Decorations Group, for the Feast of St. Nicholas

 
Local councils of Malta